Engaeus affinis is a species of crayfish in the family Parastacidae. It is endemic to Australia.

References

Sources
Doran, N. & Horwitz, P. 2010. Engaeus affinis. IUCN Red List of Threatened Species 2010. Retrieved February 5, 2017.

Parastacidae
Freshwater crustaceans of Australia
Crustaceans described in 1913